Sand is a municipality  in the district of Haßberge in Bavaria in Germany. It lies on the river Main.

References

Haßberge (district)